Sabatinca delobelli is a species of moth belonging to the family Micropterigidae. It was described by Pierre Viette in 1978 and is known from New Caledonia.

References

Micropterigidae
Moths described in 1978
Endemic fauna of New Caledonia